The sport of football in the country of Vanuatu is run by the Vanuatu Football Federation. The association administers the national football team as well as the Vanuatu Premia Divisen.

Seasons in Vanuatuan football
 2010–11 in Vanuatuan football
 2011–12 in Vanuatuan football

References